Pomacea falconensis is a South American species of freshwater snail with gills and an operculum, an aquatic gastropod mollusk in the family Ampullariidae.

Distribution
The native distribution of this snail is Venezuela.

References

falconensis
Gastropods described in 1958
Molluscs of Venezuela